California State University, Monterey Bay (CSUMB or Cal State Monterey Bay) is a public university in Monterey County, California. Its main campus is located on the site of the former military base Fort Ord, straddling the cities of Seaside and Marina, about one mile inland from Monterey Bay along the Central Coast of California. CSUMB also has locations in the cities of Monterey and Salinas. Founded in 1994, CSUMB is part of the California State University system and is accredited by the WASC Senior College and University Commission. The university is a Hispanic-serving institution.

History
CSUMB was founded in 1994 with a student enrollment of 654 students. Classes began August 28, 1995. The founding president was Peter Plympton Smith. It was the 22nd campus in the California State University system. The university offers 23 bachelor's degrees, 7 master's degrees, and teaching credentials.

As of the fall 2020 semester, the university had 6,276 undergraduate students, 595 graduate students and 186 full-time faculty members. The university operates on the semester system. The president is Eduardo M. Ochoa, who was appointed in May 2012.

CSUMB, in conjunction with Hartnell College, developed CS-in-3, a three-year computer science program funded in part by grants from the Foundation established by Matsui Nursery. A donation of 210 acres of prime agricultural land to the Hartnell College Foundation, valued at US$20 million was granted thereafter.

Presidents

Demographics

Faculty
In the fall of 2020, of 482 teaching faculty, 262 held doctorates or another terminal degree, and 96 were members of minority groups. The faculty includes an American Book Award winner and six Fulbright scholars.

Students
As of spring 2020, the student body was 62% female and 38% male. 33% of students enrolled were under 21 years of age, 45% between 21 and 24, 14% between 25 and 30, 8% were 31 or older. The most common majors were business administration (13%), psychology (11%), computer science (9%), kinesiology (8%), and biology (8%). 43% of students came from Monterey, Santa Cruz, and San Benito counties (all California counties) while 53% came from other parts of California, 2% from other U.S. states and 3% from outside the U.S. Nearly one third (32%) of students were low-income and just over half (53%) were first-generation college students. Distributed across class levels, 14% of students are freshmen, 12% sophomores, 27% juniors and 35% seniors; CSU Monterey Bay has a large proportion of transfer students. Graduate students make up 9%; 2% were seeking credentials and 1% were post-baccalaureate students.

As of fall 2018 Cal State Monterey Bay has the second largest enrollment percentage of Americans of unknown race or ethnicity in the California State University system. Approximately 50% of CSUMB students live on campus.

Academics

The seven most popular majors in Fall 2022

 Psychology at 13%
 Business Administration at 12%
 Computer Science at 10%
 Marine Science at 9%
 Biology at 7%
 Kinesiology at 7%
 Liberal Studies at 7%

Rankings
The 2022-2023 USNWR Best Regional Colleges West Rankings ranks Monterey 4 on top performers on social mobility, 7 on top public schools and 247 in Nursing (tie). In 2021 Monterey ranked 17 on best undergraduate Teaching.

Research
Under a cooperative agreement with the NASA Ames Research Center, the university performs remote sensing, ecosystem modeling, and geospatial research for earth system science and health. CSUMB researchers work in 10 areas, including coral reef monitoring, land use, carbon modeling and disease transmission.

Athletics

The Cal State–Monterey Bay (CSUMB) athletic teams are called the Otters. The university is a member of the Division II level of the National Collegiate Athletic Association (NCAA), primarily competing in the California Collegiate Athletic Association (CCAA) for most of its sports since the 2004–05 academic year; while its women's water polo teams compete in the Western Water Polo Association (WWPA). The Otters previously competed in the California Pacific Conference (Cal Pac) of the National Association of Intercollegiate Athletics (NAIA) from 1996–97 to 2003–04.

CSUMB competes in 14 intercollegiate varsity sports: Men's sports include baseball, basketball, cross country, golf and soccer; while women's sports include basketball, cross country, golf, soccer, softball, track & field (indoor and outdoor), volleyball and water polo.

CSUMB also has a coed sailing team which competes in the fall and spring (although the spring season is more important). The sailing team competes in the Pacific Coast Collegiate Sailing Conference (PCCSC).

Water polo
The NCAA Women's Water Polo Championship of Effective Division I sport is open to members of all three NCAA divisions. Only CSU Monterey Bay and CSU East Bay from the CCAA participate in the Western Water Polo Association.

Golf
The Otters of CSU Monterey Bay earned 1 NCAA Division II Men's Golf Championships in 2011.

Student life

Greek life
Fraternities and sororities in the Multicultural Greek Council (MGC) include:
Alpha Kappa Alpha African American interest sorority
alpha Kappa Delta Phi Asian interest sorority
Alpha Sigma Phi fraternity
Gamma Zeta Alpha Latino interest fraternity
Delta Sigma Theta African American interest sorority
Delta Omega Rho multicultural sorority
Epsilon Sigma Rho multicultural fraternity
Theta Alpha Sigma sorority
Kappa Alpha Psi African American interest fraternity
Kappa Delta Chi Latina Founded sorority
Kappa Sigma fraternity
Lambda Theta Nu Latina interest sorority
Lambda Sigma Gamma multicultural sorority
Nu Alpha Kappa Latino interest fraternity
Sigma Theta Psi multicultural sorority
Sigma Omega Nu Latina interest sorority
Omega Delta Phi multicultural fraternity

Campus
The university's goal is to be carbon neutral by 2030, with a solar array, installed in 2010, currently meeting 16 percent of the university's needs.

Additionally, the university's Dining Commons were awarded LEED Silver certification in 2011. The Dining Commons were designed to include water efficiency and natural and energy-efficient lighting.

Residence Halls

CSUMB offers housing in many areas around campus. On the main campus there are eight residence halls each renovated Army barracks. Willet, Cypress, Manzanita, Asilomar, Yarrow, Avocet, Tortuga, and Sanderling Halls surround the main quad on campus. Pinnacles and Vineyard Suites as well as Strawberry Apartments make up North Quad on the north end of campus. In fall of 2015, the university opened three new residence halls, called Promontory, all of which offering apartment size dormitories.

Tanimura & Antle Family Memorial Library
The Tanimura & Antle Family Memorial Library has  of floor space. It is located at Divarty and Fifth streets, and diagonally across from the Chapman Science Center. A roundabout sits between the library and the science building. The Tanimura & Antle Family Memorial Library is certified LEED Silver and has been cited for a range of sustainable design strategies from daylighting and low-energy use to healthy carpets, water conservation, and high-recycled content materials.

Aside from being the largest building on the CSUMB campus, it is the greenest in terms of energy usage. Up to 30% less electricity is needed, for example, because of floor-to-ceiling glass walls that let in natural light. Additionally, ventilation techniques operate through the floor instead of the ceiling, allowing cooler air to travel a lesser distance. The light let in from the atrium is indirect rather than direct sunlight.

Other locations
CSUMB has other locations within Monterey County, including CSUMB at Ryan Ranch (in Monterey), CSUMB at North Salinas, and CSUMB at Salinas City Center. The National Steinbeck Center is located at CSUMB at Salinas City Center.

CSUMB relies on Monterey–Salinas Transit for transportation among its various locations.

Notable alumni

Davion Berry (born 1991) – basketball player in the Bahraini Premier League
Jared Koenig (born 1994) – baseball player for the Oakland Athletics of Major League Baseball (MLB)

See also

Notes

References

External links

 
 Official athletics website

 
Monterey Bay
California State University, Monterey Bay
Universities and colleges in Monterey County, California
Schools accredited by the Western Association of Schools and Colleges
Educational institutions established in 1994
1994 establishments in California